Gary John Dighton (18 May 1968 – 9 January 2015) was a British cyclist. He competed in the team time trial at the 1992 Summer Olympics. Dighton won the British Best All-Rounder championship in 1990 and broke the competition record for the 25-mile time trial in 1991 with a time of 48.07. The same year he rode to victory in the National 100 mile TT championship.

Death
Gary Dighton was living near Wareham, Dorset, when he took his own life in early January 2015, at the age of 46. He is said to have been suffering from bouts of depression for some years.

References

External links
 

1968 births
2015 suicides
British male cyclists
Olympic cyclists of Great Britain
Cyclists at the 1992 Summer Olympics
People from Whittlesey
Sportspeople from Cambridgeshire
Suicides in England
20th-century British people